Kolanowski is a Polish surname. Notable people with the surname include:

Ann Kolanowski, American nurse
Edmund Kolanowski (1947–1986), Polish serial killer
Włodzimierz Kolanowski (1913–1944), Polish airman

See also
Kołakowski

Polish-language surnames